Events from the year 1404 in France

Incumbents
 Monarch – Charles VI

Events
 May - The Battle of Blackpool Sands. A French force raids the English coast as part of the Hundred Years War

Births
 14 October - Marie of Anjou, Queen of France (died 1463)

Deaths
 15 October - Marie of France, Duchess of Bar, Noblewoman (born 1344)

References

Links

1400s in France